Southern swallowtail may refer to:
 Iphiclides feisthamelii, a black-and-white butterfly found in Spain, Portugal, Morocco, Algeria, and Tunisia
 Papilio alexanor, a black-and-yellow butterfly found in Southern Europe and Western to Central Asia

Animal common name disambiguation pages